Private Pluto is a 1943 propaganda comedy cartoon produced by Walt Disney Productions. In this cartoon, Pluto is in the army and he gets antagonized by two chipmunks, later known as Chip 'n' Dale, in their first official appearance. While the chipmunks became regular antagonists of Donald Duck, they did continue to pester Pluto in Squatter's Rights (1946) and one last time in Pluto's Christmas Tree (1952).

Plot
This short showcases Pluto as a soldier during the World War II when he is a guard dog on a U.S military base. He is told there are saboteurs, and is assigned to guard a pill-box (gun emplacement). First, Pluto tries to follow marching orders, contorting himself into quite a mess. Then, he engages in hijinks with two chipmunks who are using a cannon to store and crack their nuts, and a war of wits naturally ensues.

Voice cast
Pluto: Pinto Colvig
Chip: Norma Swank
Dale: Dessie Flynn

Home media
The short was released on May 18, 2004, on Walt Disney Treasures: Walt Disney on the Front Lines and on December 7, 2004, on Walt Disney Treasures: The Complete Pluto: 1930-1947.

References

Ultimate Disney

External links

1943 animated films
1943 short films
American comedy short films
1940s Disney animated short films
Films scored by Oliver Wallace
Films directed by Clyde Geronimi
Films produced by Walt Disney
Pluto (Disney) short films
RKO Pictures animated short films
World War II films made in wartime
1940s English-language films
American animated short films
Animated films about dogs
Films about rodents
RKO Pictures short films
Chip 'n' Dale films